The Mitsubishi Hōjō mine disaster occurred December 15, 1914, in Kyushu, Japan. A gas explosion at the Hōjō (Hojyo) coal mine killed 687. It is the worst mining accident in Japanese history.

Mine details

Mitsubishi formally opened the Hōjō mine in 1908. It was the seventh mine in an elaborate network of mines known as the Mitsubishi Chikuho coalfield.

Explosion

On December 15, 1914 coal dust and methane gas mixed together in the air until some sort of spark set off a giant explosion. The blast sent the mine shaft cage, used to take miners in and out of the mine, flying out of the mine shaft.

After the explosion, the owners of mine cut up hundreds of oranges and tossed them down the shaft thinking that the citrus would negate the poison gas fumes. As the rescuers went down into the mine they "Each held a summer orange in their mouth and went down breathing only through their noses" under the same belief. After a short while to prevent the fire from spreading underground and destroying valuable coal the mine's entrances were sealed to put out the fire but as a result, also killing anyone who survived the initial explosion underground. As with most Japanese mines the wives worked with their husbands and an estimated 20% of those killed were women.

Deaths by mine sector
Deaths by mine sector location.

Bibliography 
Notes

References 
 - Total pages: 256 
 - Total pages: 968 
 - Total pages: 352 

Coal mining disasters in Japan 
1914 in Japan
1914 mining disasters
December 1914 events
1914 disasters in Japan